Sataplia Managed Reserve is a protected area and tourist attraction in Akhmeta Municipality in Imereti region of Georgia, 10 km from town of Kutaisi. Visitors center is located in village lower Alvani at the slopes of extinct volcano — Mount Sataplia.  The name Sataplia can be freely translated as a "honey place" (In Georgian language  თაფლი , tapli means honey. ) and in fact bees used to live in small holes and caves and honey was harvested by the local population.

Sataplia Managed Reserve  is part of Imereti Caves Protected Areas, which also includes Sataplia Strict Nature Reserve,  Prometheus Cave Natural Monument.

See also
Sataplia Strict Nature Reserve

References 

Managed reserves of Georgia (country)
Protected areas established in 2012
Geography of Kakheti
Tourist attractions in Kakheti